Vishnu Sadashiv Kokje (born 6 September 1939) is an Indian jurist, who served as the Governor of Himachal Pradesh from 08 May 2003 to 19 July 2008 and International President of Vishva Hindu Parishad.

Life and career 

Kokje was born in Madhya Pradesh on 6 September 1939.  He started practising law in 1964 after completing his LLB from Indore.  He was appointed a judge of Madhya Pradesh High Court on 28 July 1990.  He served as acting Chief Justice of Rajasthan High Court for 11 months in 2001 and was designated as senior advocate of the Supreme Court of India in September 2002.

He became Governor of Himachal Pradesh on 8 May 2003, serving in that post until 19 July 2008. He also served as the President of Bharat Vikas Parishad.  On the 14th of April, 2018, he succeeded Shri Raghav Reddy as International President of VHP. Vishnu Sadashiv Kokje was elected new VHP chief. Shri Pravin Togadia was International Working President and he was succeeded by Shri Alok Kumar Advocate as International Working President of VHP. He served as one of the working defendants in the 2002 Zakia Jafri SC case.

References

1939 births
Living people
Marathi people
20th-century Indian judges
Madhya Pradesh politicians
20th-century Indian lawyers
Governors of Himachal Pradesh
Chief Justices of the Rajasthan High Court
Judges of the Madhya Pradesh High Court
Politicians from Indore
Vishva Hindu Parishad members
President of Vishva Hindu Parishad